Serhiy Dotsenko (born July 27, 1979 in Simferopol, Ukrainian SSR, Soviet Union) is a Russian former professional boxer who competed during 2001. As an amateur, Dotesenko represented Ukraine at the 2000 Summer Olympics and won the silver medal in the welterweight bracket.

Olympic results
Defeated Guillermo Saputo (Argentina) 12-7
Defeated Parkpoom Jangphonak (Thailand) 13-5
Defeated Daniyar Munaytbasov (Kazakhstan) 8-7
Defeated Vitalie Gruşac (Moldova) 17-8
Lost to Oleg Saitov (Russia) 16-24

Pro career
Dotsenko began his professional career a year later and won his only three pro bouts, retiring in the same year in which he turned pro.

Professional boxing record

External links
 sports-reference
 

1979 births
Living people
Boxers at the 2000 Summer Olympics
Olympic boxers of Ukraine
Olympic silver medalists for Ukraine
Olympic medalists in boxing
Sportspeople from Simferopol
Ukrainian male boxers
Medalists at the 2000 Summer Olympics
Welterweight boxers